The Adventures of Pinocchio is a 1972 Italian five-part miniseries directed by Luigi Comencini, which originally aired weekly on Rai 1 between April 8 and May 6, 1972. Based on Carlo Collodi's 1883 novel with the same name, the miniseries received a large critical success, and had an average of twenty-one and a half million viewers during its first airing. All the episodes together make up 280 minutes of runtime.

An extended cut of the series, totaling 320 minutes of runtime divided into six episodes, first aired in France on Première chaîne de l'ORTF between December 19 and December 31, 1972. Also, a 135-minute edit of the miniseries was released as a theatrical film in Italy on December 21, 1972, and later released in other countries.

Plot
In rolls, a wagon promoting a Marionette spectacle, out Geppetto to see what has rolled up, seeing the Marionettes, Geppetto gets an idea to make a puppet to earn him a crust of bread and a cup of wine. He visits his friend Mastro Ciliegia (who just had a strange encounter with a log of wood) and asks for a log to make a marionette. Ciliegia offers the magic log, but Geppetto refuses, suddenly the wood flies at Geppetto striking him. Geppetto (thinking Mastro Ciliegia has thrown the wood at him) attacks him, they then calm down and Geppetto takes the magic log. 

When Geppetto gets home he starts to carve and shape the wood into a marionette and decides to name the puppet Pinocchio thinking it will bring him good luck. But once he makes the head and eyes, the eyes look around the room. Geppetto only thinking he is hunger-crazed eats a dinner of bread cooked over coals. Geppetto makes the puppet's arms and when the arms hit him on the head, he then realizes that puppet is really alive. Once the puppet is finished and clothed, it starts to walk but stumbles and falls. 

Later that night when Geppetto is sleeping, the Fairy with Turquoise Hair (who resembles Geppetto's wife, who has died) visits the carpenter's shop to see Pinocchio. The woman makes a deal with the puppet: if he behaves, honoring his father in the process, he will become a human being, otherwise, he will remain a piece of wood. Pinocchio promises and magically becomes a real child.

The next morning Geppetto is shocking to find his puppet a real boy, but then Pinocchio runs off. He steals food from a fisherman but two Carabinieri catch him. Deciding Geppetto is at fault, he takes him to jail. Pinocchio tries to find food but only gets water dumped on him. He goes home and finds the Talking Cricket, who tells him to be good. But Pinocchio just throws a hammer at him, smashing a picture of the Geppetto's deceased wife. Pinocchio puts his feet in the fire and turns back into a puppet.

Geppetto comes back and sees Pinocchio has burned off his feet, but Pinocchio weeps so much that the Fairy turns him back into a real boy. Pinocchio now decides to try being good and go to school but he will need a school book, Geppetto decides to sell his coat to buy Pinocchio an A-B-C reader. Pinocchio on the way to the schoolhouse hears a trumpet and decides to follow the music. He finds fox and a cat) promoting a wonderful marionette spectacle and Pinocchio sells his book to a ragpicker to get in. But he is brought on stage by the marionettes of the company and turns back into a wooden puppet, but the stage master takes Pinocchio.

Geppetto & Mastro Ciliegia go to the schoolhouse to greet Pinocchio, but who is not there. He finds the Ragpicker's son with Pinocchio's A-B-C reader and finds out where his son went and goes after him. Mangiafuoco's company has now traveled out of the village and has spotted for the night. Mangiafuoco's mutton is cold so he tells the Fox & Cat to go grab Pinocchio. But the Fairy turns Pinocchio back into a boy. Mangiafuoco thinking the Fox and Cat have robbed him chases them away. 

Pinocchio admits to Mangiafuoco that he was the puppet who disrupted the last spectacle and tells his story. But Mangiafuoco's mutton is still cold and wants to burn his Marionette Harlequin, but Pinocchio says that if anyone should be burned it should be he. The Master is so heartfelt he sneezes (which happens every time he gets emotional) and decides to eat his mutton raw. Finally, Mangiafuoco decides to give Pinocchio six gold coins to help Geppetto out. 

The next morning, Pinocchio sets out and runs into two the Fox and Cat, now pretending to be Lame and Blind. Pinocchio revealed to the two his gold, but a Hen warns Pinocchio not to trust strangers, but the Cat jumps upon it and twists its neck. The farmer seeing this chases after them and the Fox & Cat then loses Pinocchio. The three later meet up at the Gambero Rosso tavern and have a feast with Pinocchio using one of Pinocchio's coins. 

Pinocchio falls asleep at the table and when he walks up finds that the Fox & Cat have left. Pinocchios heads out into the woods but is attacked by the Fox and Cat dressed as robbers, who chases Pinocchio until dawn. Pinocchio then finds a house floating on a lake and runs to it, the house belongs to the Fairy, she tells Pinocchio she is dead and then robbers catch Pinocchio and hang him by his neck from a tree. To save him the Fairy changes Pinocchio into a wooden puppet and when the noose breaks Pinocchio runs into the Fairy's House.

The Fairy summons two doctors to see if Pinocchio should say a Puppet or turn back into a boy, the Doctors have conflicting options. The Fairy then asks about Pinocchio's coins, Pinocchio lies to the Fairy and his nose begins to grow. The Fairy's maid Snail then rushes in to mock Pinocchio, he then cries and apologizes to his Fairy and is turned back into a boy. Pinocchio then tells the truth about his coins,(that he had hidden them in a well when he was chased by the Robbers) and sets out to get them. But he runs into the Fox & Cat once more, who tell Pinocchio about a magical field where if Pinocchio buries his coins, a wonderful tree full of coins will grow. Pinocchio believes this lie and buries his coin, but when Pinocchio heads out to get water, the Fox and Cat steal the money and run off.

When Pinocchio finds out he was robbed he rushes to a local judge but is put in prison for stupidity. When Pinocchio is let out he rushes back to the Fairy's house only to find a grave, he asks a passing man to read what the grave says and finds out it belongs to his dear Fairy. Pinocchio cries at the grave until he becomes hungry. He goes to a nearby farmer and reaches for some grapes but gets his foot stuck in a Foothold trap. The Farmer makes Pinocchio work as his Guard dog, as his last dog (Melampo) had died. Pinocchio is later set free when he catches the thieves who have been stealing the Farmer's chickens, the Farmer also tells Pinocchio that Geppetto has set out for sea. Geppetto has indeed set out for sea to go to the Americas in search of his son. Pinocchio follows the river down to the docks, where he sees his father out at sea, Geppetto'a boat flips over and Pinocchio dives in to save him.

Pinocchio wakes up on a beach, Pinocchio cries thinking his father is gone for good. Under a wrecked rowboat, Pinocchio finds Lucignolo, a lazy good for nothing kid. Pinocchio learns Lucignolo is a runaway from home and together the two of them get into some trouble but by the next morning, Lucignolo abandons Pinocchio. Pinocchio now hungry searches a nearby town for food, and everyone in the town offers work in exchange for food, Pinocchio being the lazy child he is refuses. But then Pinocchio finds a Breadline and the one serving food is Pinocchio's good Fairy! The Fairy makes Pinocchio slave for her before she takes him home and finally then recognizes him as her dear little puppet. The Fairy gives Pinocchio a deal, he goes to school and stays good and she'll find Geppetto for him. 

Pinocchio starts school and soon becomes the top student in the class. Pinocchio becomes so good that the Fairy is going to throw a big party for Pinocchio. But that day at school Lucignolo is reintroduced into the class, but causes a distraction and gets kicked out, Pinocchio soon also causes a distraction to follow his friend. The two escape the school ground and Pinocchio asks where Lucignolo is going in such a hurry, he says he is going to The Land of Toys, a place that has no schools and no teachers, and all they do is play all day. Lucignolo invites Pinocchio but he declines, Pinocchio rushes back to the Fairy's house but it's now dark. Pinocchio knocks at the door but only the Snail is awake and very slowly comes down to open the door. When Pinocchio goes to eat his dinner he finds out it's all porcelain, Pinocchio is so angry that he runs off to join Lucignolo. He reaches the coach and joins Lucignolo upon the donkeys pulling the coach. 

Once the two and the other kids reach the Land of Toys they all enjoy themselves. But in the morning Lucignolo and Pinocchio wake up with donkey ears, the two try to escape but are turned into donkeys with the rest of the kids. Pinocchio is sold to a Circus and during one of his performances he sees his Fairy in a box seat, he rushes up to her and when pulled by the Ringmaster he falls down and twists his leg. The Ringmaster sells Pinocchio to a Drum Manufacturer who brings the donkey down to the seashore ties a rock to his leg and kicks the rock in, dragging the donkey down to drown. But when the Drum Manufacturer pulls the rope he finds Pinocchio in his puppet form instead of a donkey. And in a range of anger, the Drum Manufacturer throws Pinocchio back into the sea.

Pinocchio swims away and out of the waves comes a giant whale. The whale seeing the puppet swallows Pinocchio up. In the throat of the whale, Pinocchio meets a tuna fish who tells Pinocchio to quit screaming and let himself be digested, Pinocchio is washed forward by a wave into the belly and finds Geppetto. Pinocchio learns that Geppetto had been swallowed up by the whale when he flipped over in his raft, a ship was also swallowed and the ship was full of boxes of supplies that Geppetto has been living off happily. That night Geppetto goes to wake up Pinocchio in his puppet form, but then he sees the puppet form before his feet of Pinocchio as a boy. The two rejoice in the belly and Pinocchio asks when they will be leaving, Geppettos wants to stay because he thinks they are living in comfort. 

That night Geppetto follows Pinocchio to the mouth of the whale, and Pinocchio tells Geppetto that the tuna fish has escaped. The two decide to escape by riding on the back of the tuna. By morning they reach shore and the series ends as the two run off to a distant house to ask for food and shelter.

Cast

 Andrea Balestri: Pinocchio
 Nino Manfredi: Geppetto
 Gina Lollobrigida: The Fairy with Turquoise Hair
 Franco Franchi: Cat
 Ciccio Ingrassia: Fox
 Lionel Stander (dubbed by Antonio Guidi): Mangiafuoco
 Domenico Santoro (dubbed by an unknown boy from Livorno): Lucignolo
 Vittorio De Sica: The Judge
 Ugo D'Alessio (dubbed by Riccardo Billi): Mastro Ciliegia
 Orazio Orlando: The Marshal
 Bruno Bassi : Theodore
 Mario Adorf: The Ringmaster
 Mario Scaccia: First doctor
 Jacques Herlin (dubbed by Stefano Satta Flores): Second doctor 
 Carlo Bagno (dubbed by Antonio Guidi): Melampo's owner
 Riccardo Billi: The Coachman
 Enzo Cannavale: The Innkeeper
 Zoe Incrocci: The Snail Maid
 Nerina Montagnani: The Marten
 Renzo Montagnani: Tuna (voice)
 Mario Ercolani: Farmer
 Carmine Torre: River Fisherman
 Piero Gentili: First Carabinieri 
 Mimmo Olivieri: Second Carabinieri 
 Paola Natale: Laundress
 Mario Narcisi: Janitor
 Vera Drudi: Female Puppeteer
 Orlando D'Ubaldo: Ragpicker
 Fredo Pistoni: Fishermen
 Antonio Danesi: Mangiafuoco's Coachman
 Christmas Siddi: Female Beggar
 Simone Santo: Hen (voice)
 Enzo Cannavale: Waiter
 Furio Meniconi: Farmer
 Giuseppe Caffarelli: Carabiniere
 Caliano Sbarra: Pinocchio's Cellmate
 Pino Ferrara: Fishermen
 Clara Colosimo: Emporium Mistress
 Luciano De Ritis: Truant Officer
 Syria Betti: Lucignolo's Mother
 Nazzareno Caldarelli: Dounut Maker
 Ferdinando Murolo: Mason
 Luigi Leoni: The Teacher
 Pietro Fuselli: The School's Director
 Mario Colombaioni: Donkey Buyer
 Walter Richter: Drum Manufacturer

References

External links

  (in Italian)
 

1972 television films
1972 films
1970s Italian-language films
Italian television films
Pinocchio films
Films directed by Luigi Comencini
Television shows based on The Adventures of Pinocchio
Films scored by Fiorenzo Carpi